Kapisillit is a settlement in the Sermersooq municipality in southwestern Greenland. In 2020, the settlement had 52 inhabitants. Kapisillit means the salmon in the Greenlandic language. The name refers to the belief that the only spawning-ground for salmon in Greenland is a river near the settlement.

Geography 

Economy 
The inhabitants mostly subsist on hunting, fishing and tourism. The settlement has its own school, church, and grocery store.

Transport 
Transport to Kapisillit is done by boat. Helicopter is sometimes used. There is no road from outside to Kapisillit, although there are plans to build a simple road from Nuuk to Kapisillit.

Population 
The population of Kapisillit has declined by nearly a third relative to the 2000 levels, levelling off since.

References

Populated places in Greenland